Pavel Sergeyevich Kaloshin (born 13 March 1998) is a Russian football player.

Club career
He made his debut in the Russian Premier League for FC Anzhi Makhachkala on 1 March 2019 in a game against FC Orenburg, as a starter.

On 5 July 2019, he signed a 5-year contract with FC Akhmat Grozny and was immediately loaned to FC Torpedo Moscow for the 2019–20 season.

References

External links
 
 
 

1998 births
People from Balashikha
Sportspeople from Moscow Oblast
Living people
Russian footballers
Association football defenders
FC Arsenal Tula players
FC Tosno players
FC Anzhi Makhachkala players
FC Akhmat Grozny players
FC Torpedo Moscow players
FC Irtysh Omsk players
Russian Premier League players
Russian First League players
Russian Second League players